Shenley is a village and civil parish in Hertfordshire, England, between Barnet and St Albans. The village is located 14 miles from Central London.

History

The history of Shenley stretches back a thousand years or more – it is mentioned in the Domesday Book of 1086. The name Shenley is based on the Anglo-Saxon Scenlai, Scenlei or Senlai, which means ‘fair or bright clearing or wood’. In the early Middle Ages, southwest Hertfordshire was heavily wooded, with isolated farmsteads or hamlets in forest clearings. Shenley would have been one of these settlements.

By the 14th century, Shenley was considered to be a convenient parish for a country estate, being within reasonable reach of London. Its pure air, after the smoke and fog of the city made it a healthy place to live. The present village of Shenley apparently grew to accommodate the families of those providing a variety of services for the country estates of the gentry. Parish registers, dating back to 1657, include service occupations such as coachmen, bailiffs, bakers and labourers. Others worked in agriculture, as cattle drovers, shepherds and millers. Craftsmen in Shenley included tailors, weavers, shoemakers, cordwainers, brick-makers, blacksmiths and carpenters. Tiles and bricks were made in the area, due to the abundance of suitable clay.

Although many of Shenley’s population were involved in humble occupations, the village was considered quite prosperous. In 1754 the village was assessed to be the sixteenth highest parish in the county (excluding the areas around St Albans) and by 1823, the rateable value of the parish was £9,796.00, with only nine other parishes in the county rating higher.

During the First World War, part of the land at Porters was requisitioned and used as an aerodrome. Mr Raphael sold the land to Middlesex County Council in 1924 and, several years later, Shenley Hospital was built on the land. The design was such that as many of the existing buildings as possible were incorporated, including the mansion, the walled garden, stables and coach houses. King George V and Queen Mary officially opened the hospital in 1934.

Shenley Hospital remained in service for over 60 years. It was then sold off to property developers for housing. It was not without some trepidation that some of the old-time residents viewed what had been described as an annex to Shenley but what, in reality, would more than double the number of residences in the village. However, the development took place, but as well as houses, Shenley Park was developed and  maintained for the enjoyment of the whole village. These included preserving the orchard and spinney for pleasant walks and recreation, landscaping the walled garden, which is often open to the public and hosts a number of events throughout the year, redeveloping the tennis courts to a high standard, and, more recently, the introduction of a teashop and play area.

Shenley is also home to the training grounds of football clubs Watford (opened in 1999) and Arsenal (opened in 2000). 

Manor Lodge School, an independent primary school for children aged 4–11, is located in the village. The school is based in a grade II listed building formerly known as Shenley Lodge which appeared as the "Cat Lady"'s house in Stanley Kubrick's A Clockwork Orange. It was also home to Second World War double agent Eddie Chapman.

Shenley is also home to the Shenley Cricket Centre, which plays host to women's and U19 international matches in the summer. At the heart of the centre is the 19th-century pavilion, originally designed by W. G. Grace. The cricketing theme runs through many of the road names on the Porters Park housing estate.

Shenley Hall is a house built in the 19th century, which benefited from additions by Sir Edwin Lutyens in 1914.

The burial place of the English Baroque architect Nicholas Hawksmoor (1661-1736) lies in St Botolph's graveyard, Shenleybury, Shenley. The church was deconsecrated in 1972 and the grave is now on private land. St Botolph's is also the final resting place of Formula One champion Graham Hill, who lived in Shenley during the 1970s.

The parish church of Shenley is now St Martin's Shenley, built in 1841.

References

External links

 
Villages in Hertfordshire
Hertsmere
Civil parishes in Hertfordshire